An election for the Tynedale District Council was held on 4 May 1995.  The Labour Party won the most seats, although the council stayed under no overall control. The whole council was up for election, and turnout was 49.0%.

Election result

See also 
Tynedale District Council elections

References 

District council elections in England
Council elections in Northumberland
 Tynedale District Council elections